Kimmirut (Syllabics: ᑭᒻᒥᕈᑦ ; known as Lake Harbour until 1 January 1996) is a community in the Qikiqtaaluk Region, Nunavut, Canada. It is located on the shore of Hudson Strait on Baffin Island's Meta Incognita Peninsula. Kimmirut means "heel", and refers to a rocky outcrop in the inlet.

It was at one time a Hudson's Bay Company trading post, and a Royal Canadian Mounted Police post. The Canadian explorer J. Dewey Soper used these posts as headquarters during his explorations in the 1920s and 1930s.

The community is served by Kimmirut Airport and by annual supply sealift. A proposal in 2005 for a road to Iqaluit was determined to be impractical owing to roundabout routing over the mountains.

Demographics 

Broadband communications 
The community has been served by the Qiniq network since 2005. Qiniq is a fixed wireless service to homes and businesses, connecting to the outside world via a satellite backbone. The Qiniq network is designed and operated by SSI Micro. In 2017, the network was upgraded to 4G LTE technology, and 2G-GSM for mobile voice.

Image gallery

Climate
Kimmirut has an Arctic climate (Köppen: ET), although it is well outside the Arctic Circle. The city has cold winters and short summers that are too cool to permit the growth of trees. It is north of the tree line, and average monthly temperatures are below freezing for eight months of the year.

Notable residents 
 Joe Arlooktoo
 Nakasuk
 Anna Kingwatsiak
 Oopik Pitsuilak
 Pudlo Pudlat
 Jamasie Teevee

See also 
 List of municipalities in Nunavut
 Tasiujarjuaq

References

Further reading

 Fisher, Kyra Vladykov. Guide to Kimmirut Artists, 2005-2006. [Kimmirut]: Municipality of Kimmirut, 2005. 
 Woodley, S. B. Community Based Tourism in Kimmirut, Baffin Island, Nunavut Regional Versus Local Attitudes. Ottawa: National Library of Canada = Bibliothèque nationale du Canada, 2001.

External links

 Official site - about
 Kimmirut official site, start page (large image)
 Photos of RCMP and HBC employees

Populated places in Baffin Island
Hudson's Bay Company trading posts in Nunavut
Hamlets in the Qikiqtaaluk Region
Road-inaccessible communities of Nunavut